It's War is a side project band created by Lennon Murphy and Frank Shooflar.  They released their first single "Heart" in 2014.

References

Musical groups established in 2014
Rock music duos
2014 establishments in the United States